is a mountain range of Hokkaidō, Japan.

Geology
The Yūbari Mountains continue the north–south line begun by the Teshio Mountains. The mountains are the result of the collision between the Kurile Island Arc and the Northeastern Japan Arc. Three formations make up the Yūbari mountains:
 Jurassic-Cretaceous formations. This forms the main ridge. It consists of serpentine and rocks of the Sorachi Group. The Sorachi Group consists of chert, greenschist, micrite limestone, and sandstone with felsic tuff. 
 Cretaceous forearc sediments. These rocks of the Yezo Supergroup are arranged around the Jurassic-Creaceous formations.
 Paleogene formations. These rocks lie to the west of the Cretaceous sediments. The paleogene formations include seams of coal.

Peaks

 Mount Yūbari
 Mount Ashibetsu
 Mount Furano Nishi
 Mount Torumukeppu
 Mount Hattaomanai
 Mount Kirigishi
 Mount Hachimori

References

外部リンク 
Furano-Ashibetsu Prefectural Natural Park (Japanese) - Hokkaido Government

Mountain ranges of Hokkaido